Granada is a city in Spain.

Granada may also refer to:

Arts and entertainment
"Granada" (song), a 1932 Mexican song about the Spanish city
"Granada" (Albéniz), an 1886 piano composition by Isaac Albéniz
Granada (board game), a 2009 financially themed Eurogame by Dirk Henn
Granada (video game), a video game for the X68000 and Mega Drive/Genesis
Camp Granada, a 1965 children's board game based on "Hello Muddah, Hello Fadduh"

Businesses
Granada plc, a former British media and catering conglomerate:
ITV Granada, formerly Granada Television, a British commercial television station, based in Manchester
Granada Productions, the production arm of Granada Television merged with Carlton International to form ITV Studios in 2009
Moto Hospitality, a chain of British service stations previously called Granada

Places

Colombia
New Kingdom of Granada, a Spanish colony with similar borders to modern Colombia
Granada, Antioquia, a town
Granada, Cundinamarca, a town
Granada, Meta, a town

Kuwait
 Granada (Kuwait), a residential area in Kuwait

Nicaragua
Granada, Nicaragua, a town
Granada Department, a subdivision of Nicaragua, similar to a province

Peru
Granada District, a district in the province of Chachapoyas
Granada, Peru, the capital city of the Granada District

Spain
Granada (province), a province of Spain
Granada (Congress of Deputies constituency)
Granada (Senate constituency)
Granada (Parliament of Andalusia constituency)
Granada (wine), a Spanish wine region
Emirate of Granada, a former Moorish kingdom in Spain
Kingdom of Granada (Crown of Castile), a former territory of the Crown of Castile

United States
Granada, Colorado
Granada War Relocation Center in Colorado during World War II
Granada Hills, Los Angeles, California
Granada, Minnesota
Granada, Missouri
Granada Middle School in Whittier, California

Education
Granada High School (disambiguation)
Granada Hills Charter High School in California

Other uses
Ford Granada (Europe) and Ford Granada (North America), automobiles produced by the Ford Motor Company
1159 Granada, an asteroid
Granada CF, a Spanish football club

See also
1066 Granada massacre, a pogrom against the Jews
El Granadas, a British rope spinning variety act
Granadilla (disambiguation)
Grenada (disambiguation)
Grenade (disambiguation)
Kingdom of Granada (disambiguation)
New Granada (disambiguation)
Granada Cinema (disambiguation), several cinemas
Granada Theater (disambiguation), or theatre, several buildings